Ynfane Avanica (born April 24, 1979), known professionally as Ana Capri, is a Filipino actress.

Career
In 1996, Capri made her screen debut in Virgin People 2, directed by Celso Ad. Castillo, where she acted alongside Sunshine Cruz, Sharmaine Suarez and Tonton Gutierrez.

Filmography

Television

Film

Awards and nominations

References

External links
 

1979 births
Living people
Filipino television actresses
Filipino film actresses
GMA Network personalities
ABS-CBN personalities